Prince Leopold of Belgium, Duke of Brabant, Count of Hainaut (12 June 1859  – 22 January 1869), was the second child and only son of King Leopold II of Belgium and his wife, Marie Henriette of Austria, and heir apparent to the Belgian throne.

Life

At birth, Leopold was styled Count of Hainaut, as the eldest son of the then-crown prince. At the time of his birth, his grandfather Leopold, formerly a Prince of Saxe-Coburg and Gotha, was the reigning king of Belgium.

Leopold was preceded in birth by one sister, Princess Louise, and followed by two more sisters, Princess Stéphanie, and Princess Clémentine, who was born after Leopold's death, their parents' last hope for another son.

Leopold became Duke of Brabant in 1865, upon the death of his grandfather and the ascension of his father to the throne.

Death

Leopold died at Laeken or Brussels on 22 January 1869 from pneumonia, after falling into a pond.

At his son's funeral, King Leopold II "broke down in public, collapsing to his knees beside the coffin and sobbing uncontrollably." Prince Leopold's body was interred at the royal vault at the Church of Our Lady of Laeken in Brussels.

Leopold's premature death left his father with only two children remaining: Princess Louise and Princess Stéphanie. After their son's death, Leopold and Marie Henriette tried to have another child, hoping for a son. After the birth of yet another daughter, Clémentine, in 1872, the couple abandoned all hopes of ever having another son and their already strained marriage broke down completely. 

Upon his death in 1909, Leopold II was succeeded by his nephew, Albert I, whose eldest son would later succeed him as Leopold III.

Honours
  Spain: Knight of the Order of the Golden Fleece, 11 February 1866

Ancestry

References

|-

1859 births
1869 deaths
House of Saxe-Coburg and Gotha (Belgium)
Princes of Saxe-Coburg and Gotha
Heirs apparent who never acceded
Deaths from pneumonia in Belgium
People from Laeken
19th-century Belgian people
Burials at the Church of Our Lady of Laeken
Leopold II of Belgium
Knights of the Golden Fleece of Spain
Royalty and nobility who died as children
Sons of kings